Norway has participated in every edition of both the Summer and Winter Paralympics, except the second Summer Games in 1964. It was one of the seventeen countries to take part in the inaugural Paralympic Games in 1960 in Rome, where it sent a delegation of eleven athletes. Norway was the host country of both the 1980 Winter Paralympics, in Geilo, and the 1994 Winter Paralympics, in Lillehammer.

Norwegian athletes have won a total of 584 Paralympic medals, of which 234 were gold, 194 silver and 156 bronze. 315 of these (including 134 of the gold) have been won at the Winter Games. As of 2010, Norway is the most successful country of all time at the Winter Paralympics, and ranks twelfth on the all-time Paralympic Games medal table (for Summer and Winter Games combined).

Norway has topped the medal chart on four occasions at the Winter Games: in 1980, 1988, 1994 and 1998. It finished in the top ten in every edition of the Winter Games until 2002, included, then dropped to 12th in 2006 and 2010.

Norway boasts some of the world’s most successful Winter Paralympians of all time:
 Ragnhild Myklebust has won medals in every event she has ever participated in, in cross-country skiing, ice sledge speed racing and biathlon. Between 1988 and 2002, she won 27 medals, of which 22 were gold, 3 silver, and 2 bronze.
 Cato Zahl Pedersen has represented Norway at both the Summer and Winter Paralympics. He competed in both in 1980, making a perfect Paralympic début by entering four events in athletics, three in alpine skiing, one in cross-country skiing, and winning gold in all seven. Between 1980 and 1994, he won 14 medals in these sports, of which 13 were gold and 1 silver.
 Erling Trondsen competed in swimming from 1976 to 1992. He swam in 22 events, and won medals in 20 of them: 13 gold, 6 silver, and 1 bronze.
 Terje Loevaas took part in 13 events in cross-country skiing between 1980 and 1994, and won medals in all of them: 10 gold and 3 silver. During the same period, he also won 5 medals in athletics: 2 silver and 3 bronze.

Medals

Summer Paralympics

Winter Paralympics

See also
 Norway at the Olympics

References